A sigil is a type of symbol used in magic.

Sigil may also refer to:

 Sigil, a seal used to authenticate a document, a wrapper for one such as a modern envelope, or the cover of a container or package holding valuables or other objects
 Sigillion, a type of legal document publicly affirmed with a seal, usually of lead

Arts and entertainment
 Sigil (comics), a comic book from CrossGen
 Sigil (Dungeons & Dragons), a city in the Dungeons & Dragons roleplaying game
Sigil (mod), a 2019 Doom mod created by John Romero
 Sigil, a 2003 album by Cauda Pavonis
 Sigil, a 2006 album by Nuru Kane

Computing
 Sigil (application), free, open-source editing software for e-books in the EPUB format
 Sigil (computer programming), a symbol affixed to a variable name, showing the variable's datatype or scope

Other uses
 Polygonatum, a genus of flowering plants
 Sigil Games Online, a computer software company based in Carlsbad, California, United States
 Sigil Collective, the name of an art/architecture collective based in Beirut and New York City founded by Salim al-Kadi, Khaled Malas, Alfred Tarazi and Jana Traboulsi

See also
 Black Sigil: Blade of the Exiled, a role-playing video game for the Nintendo DS developed by Studio Archcraft
 Scribal abbreviation or siglum, an abbreviation used as critical apparatus by ancient and medieval scribes writing in various languages, including Latin, Greek, Old English and Old Norse